Lewis Harfield (16 August 1905 – 19 November 1985) was an English first-class cricketer. A right-handed batsman who bowled right-arm medium pace, he made his first-class debut for Hampshire in the 1925 County Championship against Warwickshire at Edgbaston.

Harfield played 80 first-class matches for Hampshire between 1925 and 1931, the 1929 season being his most successful as he scored 1,216 runs from 27 matches at a batting average of 26.43, with nine half centuries and a high score of 89 against Sussex. In the 1929 season Harfield was awarded his county cap.

Harfield's final match for Hampshire came in the 1931 County Championship against Nottinghamshire at Dean Park Cricket Ground in Bournemouth. In Harfield's 80 first-class matches for the county he scored 2,460 runs at a batting average of 20.00, with 13 half centuries and a high score of 89. Harfield was a determined player with a sound defence, who played strokes on both sides of the wicket and was an especially good hooker of the ball. With the ball itself, Harfield took 14 wickets at a bowling average of 46.35, with best figures of 3/35. In the field Harfield took 37 catches.

Harfield died at Winchester, Hampshire on 19 November 1985.

External links
Lewis Harfield at Cricinfo
Lewis Harfield at CricketArchive
Matches and detailed statistics for Lewis Harfield

1905 births
1985 deaths
People from the City of Winchester
English cricketers
Hampshire cricketers